Orchesia is a genus of false darkling beetles in the family Melandryidae. There are about 19 described species in Orchesia.

Species
These 19 species belong to the genus Orchesia:

 Orchesia blandula Brancsik, 1874 g
 Orchesia canaliculata (Alekseev & Bukejs, 2015) g
 Orchesia castanea Melsheimer, 1846 g b
 Orchesia cultriformis Laliberte, 1967 g b
 Orchesia fasciata (Illiger, 1798) g
 Orchesia fusiformis Solsky, 1871 g
 Orchesia gracilis Melsheimer, 1846 b
 Orchesia grandicollis Rosenhauer, 1847 g
 Orchesia keili Roubal, 1933 g
 Orchesia luteipalpis Mulsant & Guillebeau, 1857 g
 Orchesia maculata Mulsant & Godart, 1856 g
 Orchesia micans (Panzer, 1794) g
 Orchesia minor Walker, 1837 g
 Orchesia ornata Horn, 1888 g b
 Orchesia ovata Laliberte, 1967 g b
 Orchesia rasnitzyni Nikitsky, 2011 g
 Orchesia rennelli Gressitt & Samuelson, 1964 g
 Orchesia turkini Alekseev & Bukejs, 2012 g
 Orchesia undulata Kraatz, 1853 g

Data sources: i = ITIS, c = Catalogue of Life, g = GBIF, b = Bugguide.net

References

Further reading

External links

 

Melandryidae